Raghbir Singh may refer to:
 Raghbir Singh Panjhazari (1914–1999), Indian politician
 Raghbir Singh (chief minister) (1895–1955), Indian politician
 Raghbir Singh Bhola (1927–2019), Indian Air Force officer and field hockey player
 Raghbir Singh Pathania (1874–1915), British Indian Army officer